Ernst Haenchen (10 December 1894 – 30 April 1975) was a German Protestant theologian, professor, and Biblical scholar.

Life 
Ernst Haenchen grew up as the youngest son of a government official along with his two siblings in the West Prussian county town Czarnikau. In 1914 he began studying theology at the Humboldt University of Berlin, which he had to interrupt in the same year after the outbreak of the First World War. The loss of his right leg as a result of a 1918 suffered war injury influenced his further career. In 1926 he first completed his studies in theology at the University of Tübingen. He gave up his first pastorate following a severe fall as a result of his disability and decided to devote himself entirely to science. He returned to the University of Tübingen, where in 1926 he began teaching as an outside lecturer for Systematic theology.

A tuberculosis disease forced 1928 a total of two years in Davos, Switzerland. There he met his future wife Marguérite Fahrenberger (1905-1990), the daughter of Davos priest Johannes Fahrenberger. In 1933 Haenchen was appointed Full Professor of Systematic Theology at the University of Giessen, where he was elected dean of the Theological Faculty that same year. On 24 March 1939 he moved to the University of Münster, again to the Chair of Systematic Theology. After the closure of the University of Münster in 1944, Ernst Haenchen resided in Davos, Switzerland, until 1948, in order to cure his tuberculosis disease again. During this time, his first major academic work, a commentary on Acts of the Apostles, which made him soon known in theology circles. The 1956 first published work was quickly sold out and was updated and supplemented for the following editions by the author until his death.

Ernst Haenchen was briefly a member of the German Christians in 1933. But after a rally at the Berlin Sportpalast on 13 November 1933, where Reinhold Krause, chairman of the German Christians in Greater Berlin Act, declared a turning away of German Christianity from his Jewish roots, Haenchen left the movement. On 13 February 1939, however, he registered with the Nazi Party, a month before his appointment as a full professor at the University of Münster. As a consequence, in 1945 he lost his professorship in Münster again. A proper retirement did not take place until 1946. As an Emeritus, Haenchen continued teaching at the University of Münster for a number of years. Shortly before his death, he finished the text of his second, posthumously published masterpiece, a commentary on the Gospel according to John. Haenchen died in Münster on 30 April 1975.

Ernst Haenchen was the uncle of the photographer Karl Ludwig Haenchen.

Works 
 Die Frage nach der Gewissheit beim jungen Augustin (Tübinger Studien zur systematischen Theologie ; 1), Stuttgart 1932.
 Volk und Staat in der Lehre der Kirche. In: Volk. Staat. Kirche. Ein Lehrgang der Theologischen Fakultät Gießen. Verlag von Alfred Töpelmann, Gießen 1933.
 Die Botschaft des Thomas-Evangeliums. Theologische Bibliothek Töpelmann ; 6, Berlin 1961.
 Gott und Mensch. Gesammelte Aufsätze. Tübingen 1965.
 Der Weg Jesu. Eine Erklärung des Markus-Evangeliums und der kanonischen Parallelen (Sammlung Töpelmann. 2. Reihe: Theologische Hilfsbücher;6), Berlin 1966 (2. durchges. u. verb. Aufl. 1968).
 Die Bibel und wir. Gesammelte Aufsätze. Zweiter Band, Tübingen 1968, .
 Die Gnosis. Band I: Zeugnisse der Kirchenväter. Unter Mitwirkung von Ernst Haenchen und Martin Krause eingeleitet, übersetzt und erläutert von Werner Foerster. Zürich 1969 (Nachdruck 1995), .
 Die Apostelgeschichte. Kritisch-exegetischer Kommentar über das Neue Testament / begr. von Heinrich August Wilhelm Meyer. Hrsg. von Ferdinand Hahn ; 3, Göttingen 1977 (16. Aufl., 7., durchges. u. verb. Aufl. dieser Neuauslegung), .
 Das Evangelium nach Thomas / möglichst wortgetreue Übers. von Ernst Haenchen. Neu-Isenburg 1979  .
 Das Johannesevangelium – ein Kommentar. Aus den nachgelassenen Manuskripten hrsg. von U. Busse mit einem Vorwort von J. M. Robinson. Tübingen 1980, .

Literature 
Festschrift für Ernst Haenchen zu seinem 70. Geburtstag am 10. Dezember 1964, herausgegeben von Walther Eltester (Zeitschrift für die neutestamentliche Wissenschaft und die Kunde der älteren Kirche / Beihefte ; 30), Berlin 1964

References

External links 
 

1894 births
1975 deaths
20th-century Protestant theologians
Academic staff of the University of Giessen
Academic staff of the University of Münster
New Testament scholars
Nazi Party members
20th-century German theologians
German Protestant theologians
People from Czarnków
Humboldt University of Berlin alumni
University of Tübingen alumni
Academic staff of the University of Tübingen
German expatriates in Switzerland